Lieutenant General Albert Patton Clark (August 27, 1913 – March 8, 2010) was the sixth superintendent of the United States Air Force Academy near Colorado Springs, Colorado.

Biography
Clark was born at Schofield Barracks, Hawaii, in 1913. He is a 1936 graduate of the United States Military Academy at West Point, New York and completed flying training at Randolph Field, Texas, in 1937.

He then served at Selfridge Field, Michigan and in June 1942, went to England as second in command of the 31st Fighter Group, the first American fighter unit in the European Theater of Operations. He was shot down over Abbeville, France, in July 1942 and was a prisoner of war at German prison camp Stalag Luft III until April 1945. He wrote about his experiences in Stalag Luft III in his book 33 Months as a POW in Stalag Luft III. He was a manager of accumulation and hiding of supplies used in the 1944 breakout in which 76 POWs escaped. That incident was documented in the 1950 book The Great Escape, and later was celebrated in the 1963 movie of the same title.

After World War II, he progressed through key staff assignments with Tactical Air Command, Continental Air Command and Air Defense Command prior to a tour of duty at Headquarters U.S. Air Force.

Clark commanded the 48th Fighter Bomber Wing at Chaumont Air Base in France, in 1955–1956, and then served as chief of staff of the U.S. Air Forces in Europe.

His next assignment was as Chief, U.S. Military Training Mission to Saudi Arabia.

He was director of military personnel at Headquarters U.S. Air Force for four years beginning in 1959 and was then assigned to Okinawa as commander of the 313th Air Division.

In August 1965, he was named vice commander of the Tactical Air Command. He assumed duties as commander of Air University in August 1968, and in August 1970, he was appointed superintendent of the U.S. Air Force Academy.

A command pilot, he was a graduate of the Armed Forces Staff College and the National War College.

Clark died on March 8, 2010, at age 96.

Awards and decorations
His military decorations and awards include the Air Force Distinguished Service Medal, Legion of Merit with oak leaf cluster, Purple Heart, Air Medal, and the Air Force Commendation Medal. He retired from the Air Force on August 1, 1974.

  Air Force Distinguished Service Medal
  Legion of Merit with oak leaf cluster
  Purple Heart
  Air Medal
  Air Force Commendation Medal

Publications

References

Albert P. Clark's Denver Post obituary

Notes

United States Air Force generals
Superintendents of the United States Air Force Academy
United States Military Academy alumni
Recipients of the Air Force Distinguished Service Medal
Recipients of the Legion of Merit
World War II prisoners of war held by Germany
United States Army Air Forces pilots of World War II
1913 births
2010 deaths
Military personnel from Hawaii
Recipients of the Air Medal
United States Army Air Forces officers